One Show may refer to:

The One Club, an American non-profit organization
The One Show, a British television newsmagazine programme